Santo Antônio de Leverger is a municipality in the southern part of the state of Mato Grosso, Brazil.

The municipality contains the  Águas Quentes State Park, the first protected area in Mato Grosso, which is known for the healing powers of its thermal waters.

Population history

References

External links
 http://www.citybrazil.com.br/mt/stoantoniojacinto/ 

Municipalities in Mato Grosso